Phasmahyla cruzi is a species of frog in the subfamily Phyllomedusinae. It is endemic to Brazil and solely known from the vicinity of its type locality, Rio das Pedras Reserve in the municipality of Mangaratiba, Rio de Janeiro state. The range extends into the adjacent Paraty municipality. This species is named for Carlos Alberto Gonçalves da Cruz, Brazilian herpetologist. The common name Mangaratiba tree frog has been proposed for it.

Description
The body and limbs are slender. The snout is short and truncated. The eyes are large and protuberant. The tympanum is small and its upper part is hidden by the supratympanic fold. The fingers and the toes bear small terminal discs. No webbing is present. Skin is smooth. Dorsal coloration is light to dark green with light to dark purple dots. The concealed parts of the limbs and flanks are orange with many small purple spots. The belly is cream. The iris is silver-gray.

Tadpoles of Gosner stage 37 measure  in total length, which includes the  ovoid body. The mouth is anterodorsal and has a funnel-shaped dermal fold.

Habitat and conservation
In general, Phasmahyla are associated with mountain streams in the Atlantic Forest domain.

As of April 2022, this species has not been assessed for the IUCN Red List of Threatened Species.

References

cruzi
Frogs of South America
Amphibians of Brazil
Endemic fauna of Brazil
Amphibians described in 2009